Annie Sylvia Wikman (born 27 April 2001) is an Australian cricketer who plays primarily as a right-handed batter for the ACT Meteors in the Women's National Cricket League (WNCL).

Domestic career
Wikman plays grade cricket for Western Suburbs District Cricket Club, and played age-group cricket for Queensland. In February 2022, she was called-up to the ACT Meteors squad for the restart of the 2021–22 Women's National Cricket League season. She made her debut for the side on 13 March 2022, against Queensland, making 20 from 26 balls as her side won by 86 runs. Overall, she played four matches for the side that season. She played five matches for the side in the 2022–23 Women's National Cricket League season, scoring 147 runs and taking three wickets. She made her maiden List A half-century in December 2022, scoring 63 against South Australia.

References

External links

2001 births
Living people
Cricketers from Brisbane
Australian women cricketers
ACT Meteors cricketers